Fox News Watch was an American current event debate program on the Fox News Channel hosted by Jon Scott which was dedicated to discussing media bias. The show ended August 31, 2013, replaced by the similar MediaBuzz.

Format
The show featured a panel composed of two conservatives and two liberals, moderated by Scott. Similar in premise to CNN's Reliable Sources, the panel on Fox News Watch discussed how the media portrayed certain news stories from the previous week. Panelists also discussed the overall condition of the American news media, such as the newspapers, cable news networks, broadcast networks, and other popular news outlets.

Departures
On February 2, 2008, Eric Burns said that Neal Gabler had left the show to work for PBS and that Jim Pinkerton had left the show to work for Mike Huckabee. In June 2008, Pinkerton had returned to the panel.

Burns' contract was not renewed and expired in Spring 2008, reportedly saying in an interview that, "Fox News has told me that my contract will be terminated within the next 2 months, perhaps sooner. I was given no reason. It certainly has nothing to do with ratings; the last episode of Fox News Watch was the second highest-rated weekend show on all 3 cable news networks and the program has almost been in the top 4 or 5. I have no theory, none, why they are getting rid of me. Although I heard rumors, I have never heard reasons."  Fox News responded by saying Burns's contract was a contributor agreement rather than a talent agreement. Burns was replaced by Jon Scott.

The final Fox News Watch program aired August 31, 2013.

Howard Kurtz hosts the replacement program MediaBuzz.

Personalities

Hosts
Eric Breindel (1997–1998)
Eric Burns (1998–2008)
E. D. Hill (2008)
Jon Scott (2008–2013)
Rick Folbaum (2009–2013)

Panelists
Alan Colmes
Cal Thomas
Rich Lowry
Jim Pinkerton
Judith Miller (2008–2013)
Ellis Henican

Former panelists
Neal Gabler (2002–2008)
Laura Flanders (1997–1998)
Jeff Cohen (1997–2002)
Jane Hall  (1997–2009)

Reception and criticism
Left-wing media critics and bloggers argue that Fox News Watch perpetuates the myth of liberal bias in the mainstream media while ignoring conservative bias by Fox News. Fox News Watch has also been accused of ignoring or dismissing controversies concerning Fox News' parent company, News Corporation, such as when an outtake was leaked online showing the program's panelists refusing to discuss News Corp's phone hacking scandal. This issue was, however, later discussed in-depth (and without further refusal) during a broadcast on July 16, 2011.

References

External links
 Fox News Watch on FOXNews.com
 

Fox News original programming
1990s American television news shows
2000s American television news shows
2010s American television news shows
1997 American television series debuts
2013 American television series endings